Naked City is an American police procedural television series from Screen Gems that aired on ABC from 1958 to 1959 and from 1960 to 1963. It was inspired by the 1948 motion picture The Naked City and mimics its dramatic "semi-documentary" format. As in the film, each episode concluded with a narrator intoning the iconic line: "There are eight million stories in the naked city. This has been one of them."

The Naked City episode "Four Sweet Corners" (1959) inspired the series Route 66, created by Stirling Silliphant. Route 66 was broadcast by CBS from 1960 to 1964, and, like Naked City, followed the "semi-anthology" format of building the stories around the guest actors, rather than the regular cast. In 1997, the episode "Sweet Prince of Delancey Street" (1961) was ranked number 93 on TV Guide "100 Greatest Episodes of All Time" list.

Synopsis
Filmed on location in New York City, the series concerned the detectives of NYPD's 65th Precinct (changed from the film's 10th Precinct). Episode plots usually focused more on the criminals and victims portrayed by guest actors, characteristic of the "semi-anthology" narrative format common in early 1960s television (so called by the trade paper Variety). For the first season, the primary writer was Stirling Silliphant, who wrote 32 of the season's 39 episodes. Silliphant's work resulted in significant critical acclaim for the series and attracted film and television actors of the time to seek guest-starring roles.

Many scenes were filmed in the South Bronx near Biograph Studios (also known as Gold Medal Studios), where the series was produced, and in Greenwich Village and other neighborhoods in Manhattan. The exterior of the "65th Precinct" was the Midtown North (18th) Precinct, at 306 West 54th Street between Eighth and Ninth Avenues, in the second and the third season, and the current 9th Precinct, at 321 East 5 Street between 1st and 2nd Avenues before it was renovated, in the first and in the fourth seasons.

Naked City was first broadcast during the 1958–59 season, with the title The Naked City, as a half-hour series featuring James Franciscus and John McIntire playing Detective Jimmy Halloran and Lt. Dan Muldoon – the same characters as in the 1948 film (played there by Don Taylor and Barry Fitzgerald). Harry Bellaver played the older, mellow Sgt. Frank Arcaro, and the narrator for the first season was the producer, Herbert B. Leonard, identifying himself as "Bert Leonard". While critically acclaimed, the series did not have good ratings. Midway through the season, McIntire quit the show (his character being killed in a car crash with a criminal) because of his desire to leave New York and relocate back to his Montana ranch. He was replaced with Horace McMahon, who was then introduced in the same episode as Muldoon's curmudgeonly replacement, Lieutenant Mike Parker.

The cast change did not help the show's ratings; ABC cancelled Naked City at the end of the 1958–59 season. One of the show's sponsors (Brown & Williamson), along with production staff, successfully lobbied the network to revive the show as an hour-long series, which premiered in 1960. The 1960 version featured Paul Burke as Detective Adam Flint, a sensitive and cerebral policeman in his early thirties. Horace McMahon returned as Lt. Parker as did Harry Bellaver as Sgt. Arcaro. Nancy Malone appeared regularly (for about half the newly produced episodes) as Adam Flint's aspiring actress girlfriend, Libby Kingston. The hour-long version of the show was broadcast by ABC in the 10:00 p.m. slot on Wednesday nights.

For this iteration of the series, writer Silliphant was forced to reduce his involvement considerably, as he was simultaneously working as the main scriptwriter for Route 66 which began in October 1960. Silliphant wrote the first three episodes of Naked City'''s second season, then did not write any further episodes until he wrote three episodes for season four. Those employed as writers of Naked City episodes during seasons 2, 3 and 4 included veteran TV writer Howard Rodman (who also served as story editor), blacklisted screenwriter Arnold Manoff (writing with the pseudonym "Joel Carpenter"), and Shimon Wincelberg. Noted science-fiction TV writers Charles Beaumont and Gene Roddenberry also each contributed one episode.

Guest stars
The series was notable for featuring younger and/or lesser-known/little-known actors, some of whom became major stars, including Alan Alda, Michael Ansara, Ed Asner, Martin Balsam, Barbara Barrie, Orson Bean, Robert Blake, James Caan, Godfrey Cambridge, Joseph Campanella, Diahann Carroll, James Coburn, Michael Constantine, William Daniels, Sandy Dennis, Bruce Dern, David Doyle, Keir Dullea, Robert Duvall, Peter Falk, James Farentino, Peter Fonda, Conard Fowkes, Eileen Fulton, Frank Gorshin, Harry Guardino, Gene Hackman, Barbara Harris, Dustin Hoffman, Dennis Hopper, Diana Hyland, Richard Jaeckel, David Janssen, Salome Jens, Jack Klugman, Shirley Knight, Piper Laurie, Diane Ladd, Audra Lindley, Jack Lord, George Maharis, Nancy Marchand, Sylvia Miles, Vic Morrow, Barry Morse, Robert Morse, Lois Nettleton, Leslie Nielsen, Carroll O'Connor, Susan Oliver, Marisa Pavan, Suzanne Pleshette, Robert Redford, Doris Roberts, Mark Rydell, Telly Savalas, George Segal, William Shatner, Martin Sheen, Tom Simcox, Jean Stapleton, Maureen Stapleton, Rod Steiger, Mel Stuart, Rip Torn, Cicely Tyson, Brenda Vaccaro, Dick Van Patten, Jon Voight, Christopher Walken, Deborah Walley, Jack Warden, Tuesday Weld, and Dick York.

The show also featured more established and/or better-known actors, including Luther Adler, Eddie Albert, Robert Alda, Louise Allbritton, Kirk Alyn, Richard Basehart, Theodore Bikel, Nancy Carroll, Lee J. Cobb, Gladys Cooper, Hume Cronyn, Ludwig Donath, Diana Douglas, Betty Field, Geraldine Fitzgerald, Nina Foch, Ruth Ford, Martin Gabel, Peggy Ann Garner, Vincent Gardenia, Eileen Heckart, Barnard Hughes, Kim Hunter, Sam Jaffe, Glynis Johns, Kurt Kasznar, Abbe Lane, Eugenie Leontovich, Al Lewis, Viveca Lindfors, Ross Martin, Walter Matthau, Myron McCormick, Roddy McDowall, Burgess Meredith, Jean Muir, Meg Mundy, Mildred Natwick, Cathleen Nesbitt, Jeanette Nolan, Nehemiah Persoff, Claude Rains, Eugenia Rawls, Aldo Ray, Ruth Roman, Mickey Rooney, Albert Salmi, George C. Scott, Sylvia Sidney, Jan Sterling, Beatrice Straight, Akim Tamiroff, Lawrence Tierney, Jo Van Fleet, Eli Wallach, David Wayne, Jesse White, Cara Williams, Roland Winters, and Keenan Wynn.

Many of the actors listed above played multiple roles for different episodes, as different characters.

Sanford Meisner, the noted acting coach, made a rare celluloid performance in an episode of the series. Acting coach and actress Peggy Feury also made an appearance, in a different episode. Rocky Graziano made an appearance during his relatively brief post-boxing acting career. Actors such as Conrad Bain, Dabney Coleman, Ken Kercheval, Burt Reynolds, and Jessica Walter appeared in minor roles, long before becoming famous.

Several actors played recurring roles, e.g. Suzanne Storrs (as "Janet Halloran" in nine episodes during the series' first version, featuring Franciscus and McIntire), Jimmy Little as "Sgt. Max Higgins", Robert Dryden as "Police Surgeon", and Richard Kronold as "Detective Dutton".

EpisodesNaked City was broadcast for four seasons starting in late 1958. A total of 138 episodes were produced during the four season run.

Season 1 (1958–1959)Naked City premiered on ABC as The Naked City on September 30, 1958, with the episode Meridian. The first season was broadcast as 30-minute episodes from September 1958 to June 1959, consisting of 39 episodes. The series was cancelled after the first season. This original 30-minute version was sponsored by Viceroy cigarettes.

Season 2 (1960–1961)
The series was revived as an hour-long show in 1960 with the title, Naked City. The first episode of the revived series was A Death of Princes and premiered on October 12, 1960. This season ran until June 1961 with 32 episodes.

Season 3 (1961–1962)
The third season of Naked City premiered on September 27, 1961, with the episode Take Off Your Hat When a Funeral Passes. This season ran through June 1962 and comprised 33 episodes.

Season 4 (1962–1963)
The fourth season was the last for Naked City and started on September 19, 1962, with the episode Hold for Gloria Christmas. A total of 34 episodes were produced for this last season, which ran from September 1962 through May 1963.

Syndication
In July 2011, Retro Television Network started airing episodes of both the 30- and 60-minute versions of Naked City. In October 2011, Me-TV started carrying the hour-long show airing it weekly overnight, and in mid-2013 started showing two of the 30-minute episodes back to back.

Home media
Between 2003 and 2006 Image Entertainment, under license from Sony Pictures Home Entertainment, released a series of single-disc releases containing four of the hour-long episodes per disc, followed by three releases billed as "Box Set" 1 to 3, each of which contained three discs and 12 one-hour episodes, with their original commercials and sponsors' slots included as bonus features. These releases are now out of print. Early 2013 saw the release of a 10-disc "Best of Naked City" set containing 40 episodes, all of which had been included on the earlier DVDs, and "Naked City: 20 Star-Filled Episodes", a five-disc set with 10 more re-releases and 10 previously unreleased shows. It included two half-hour episodes, the earlier series' first appearance on DVD. None of these releases attempted to present the show in chronological order; their contents appeared to have been selected for the episodes' famous guest stars, whose names were prominently featured on their covers and other packaging.

On November 5, 2013, Image Entertainment released Naked City: The Complete Series on DVD in Region 1.  The 29-disc set contains all 138 episodes of the series.

AwardsNaked City also received Emmy nominations for Best Dramatic Series - Less Than One Hour in 1959; Outstanding Program Achievement in the Field of Drama in 1961, 1962 and 1963; Paul Burke for Outstanding Continuing Performance by an Actor in a Series in 1962 and 1963; Horace McMahon for Outstanding Performance in a Supporting Role by an Actor in 1962; Arthur Hiller for Outstanding Directorial Achievement in Drama; Nancy Malone for Outstanding Performance in a Supporting Role by an Actress in 1963; and Diahann Carroll for Outstanding Single Performance by an Actress in 1963.

In popular culture 
 The title Naked City is used for the L.A. Noire DLC vice case titled "The Naked City".
 The series is parodied in an episode of Top Cat titled "Naked Town".

Tie-in book
A tie-in collection of short stories was written to capitalize on the success of the TV series; it was titled The Naked City'' and was published as a mass-market paperback by Dell in 1959. While it was credited on the book's cover solely to series creator Stirling Silliphant, it actually consisted of writer and newspaperman Charles Einstein's prose adaptations of eight Silliphant stories from the series' first season of half-hour episodes.  Einstein is the half-brother of comedian Albert Brooks. The cover featured an evocative photo montage by photographer David Attie. While the book is well regarded by fans of the series, it has long been out of print.

References

External links

 
 
 

1958 American television series debuts
1963 American television series endings
1950s American crime drama television series
1950s American police procedural television series
1960s American crime drama television series
1960s American police procedural television series
American Broadcasting Company original programming
American television series revived after cancellation
Fictional portrayals of the New York City Police Department
Live action television shows based on films
Television series by Screen Gems
Television series by Sony Pictures Television
Television shows filmed in New York City
Television shows set in New York City